= The Soprano State =

- Author: Bob Ingle and Sandy McClure
- Language: English
- Genre: Nonfiction
- Publisher: St. Martin's Press
- Publication date: 19 February 2008
- Publication place: United States
- Media type: Print (hardcover)
- Pages: 336 pp
- ISBN: 978-0-312-36894-4

The Soprano State: New Jersey's Culture of Corruption is the best-selling nonfiction book by Trenton-based investigative reporters Bob Ingle and Sandy McClure, published by St. Martin’s Press in 2008. The book focuses on the widespread corruption of the state of New Jersey, from its politics to mobsters, to its businesses and government organizations. The title is a reference to the popular HBO series, The Sopranos.

== Reception ==
Kirkus praised the book’s in-depth look at the state’s corruption: “Ingle and McClure present a cheerless story of oligarchy and kleptocracy covering the length of the Turnpike from Cape May to Fort Lee, the executive mansion in Princeton to the statehouse in Trenton, horse country and the Pineys, Sinatra’s native turf in Hoboken and Joe Piscopo’s down at the shore." Writing in the Lexington’s Notebook column of The Economist, the writer called it “The best book I've found on New Jersey politics.”

== Documentary ==
In 2010, a documentary based on the book was directed by Peter LeDonne.
